Jamie Margolin (born December 10, 2001) is an American climate justice activist. She is the Co-Executive director of Zero Hour.

Education 
Margolin attended Holy Names Academy. She currently studies film at the New York University Tisch School of the Arts.

Activism

In 2017, at age 15, Margolin founded the youth climate action organization Zero Hour with Nadia Nazar, Zanagee Artis, and other youth activists. She served as the co-executive director of the organization until September 2020 when she stepped down. She was replaced by fellow founder and youth activist Madelaine Tew. Margolin co-founded Zero Hour in reaction to the response she saw after Hurricane Maria in Puerto Rico and her personal experience during the 2017 Washington wildfires.

She has garnered some notoriety as a plaintiff in the Aji P. v. Washington case, suing the state of Washington for their inaction against climate change on the basis of a stable climate being a human right.

In September 2018, Margolin was part of a youth group that sued Governor Jay Inslee and the State of Washington over greenhouse-gas emissions in the state. The case was dismissed by a King County Superior Court judge, who ruled the case to be political one that must be resolved by the Governor and the legislature. It has since been appealed Washington Court of Appeals.

In September 2019, she was asked to testify on a panel called "Voices Leading the Next Generation on the Global Climate Crisis" alongside Greta Thunberg for the United States House of Representatives.

In 2021, Margolin started a Climate Justice Scholarship.

Journalism 
Her writing about climate change has appeared in many publications including HuffPost, Teen Ink and CNN. She was part of Teen Vogue’s 21 Under 21 class of 2018. In 2018, she was also named as one of People Magazine's 25 Women Changing the World.

Personal life 
Margolin identified as Jewish and Latinx. She identifies as a lesbian and speaks openly about her experiences as an LGBT person.

Margolin is a member of the Junior State of America.

Awards and honors 
Margolin won a MTV Europe Music Awards Generation Change award in 2019.

She was recognized as one of the BBC's 100 women of 2019.

Controversies 

In a New York State Supreme Court Action, Margolin was accused by Emma Tang, a Taiwanese American activist, of raping her on the night of Oct. 31, 2020.

Bibliography 

 Youth to Power: Your Voice and How to Use It (Hachette Books, 2020)

References

American environmentalists
Living people
2001 births
BBC 100 Women
Hispanic and Latino American writers
American lesbian writers
Jewish American community activists
American people of Colombian-Jewish descent
Youth climate activists
21st-century American Jews
21st-century American women writers